Bayfront Park is a Metromover station in Downtown, Miami, Florida, adjacent to Bayfront Park.

This station is located at the intersection of Southeast Second Street and Biscayne Boulevard (US 1), opening to service April 17, 1986.

The station sees very heavy ridership during special events such as New Year's Eve, when service is extended to 2 a.m.
In terms of average weekday traffic, Bayfront Park and Brickell stations are the busiest stations on the Metromover after Government Center.

Station layout

Places of interest
Hotel Intercontinental
Bayfront Park
Miami Center
One Bayfront Plaza
One Biscayne Tower
Southeast Financial Center
One Miami
50 Biscayne
Atrium Tower
Met 3
Met 1
Edward Ball Center
Met 2/JW Marriott

References

External links
 
 MDT – Metromover Stations
 entrance from Google Maps Street View

Metromover stations
Railway stations in the United States opened in 1986
1986 establishments in Florida
Brickell Loop
Inner Loop
Omni Loop